Hepialiscus monticola is a moth of the family Hepialidae. It is endemic to Taiwan.

References

Hepialidae
Moths described in 1988
Moths of Taiwan
Endemic fauna of Taiwan